SBY is an abbreviation that can stand for:

 Susilo Bambang Yudhoyono, the 6th President of Indonesia
  IATA code for Salisbury-Ocean City Wicomico Regional Airport, Maryland, US
 Shibuya Station, JR East station code